Elections to Hertfordshire County Council were held on 6 May 1993, with all 77 seats contested. The Conservative Party lost control of the council to No Overall Control with the Labour Party forming the largest political group.

Summary

Division results

Broxbourne

Dacorum

East Hertfordshire

Hertsmere

North Hertfordshire

St. Albans

Stevenage

Three Rivers

Watford

Welwyn Hatfield

References

Hertfordshire County Council elections
Hertfordshire County Council
1990s in Hertfordshire